L road may refer to :
 link roads in the old road system of Ireland
 local roads in the current road system of Ireland
 Corridor L, a part of the Appalachian Development Highway System in the U.S. state of West Virginia
 Small roads or short distance roads in Zimbabwe